Vipin Buckshey is an Indian optometrist and the official optometrist to the President of India. Born on 3 June 1955 in Gwalior, in the Indian state of madhya Pradesh, he did his schooling at the Frank Anthony Public School after which secured a degree in optometry from the All India Institute of Medical Sciences, New Delhi. He started his career at Lawrence and Mayo, Delhi and a ophthalmic executive where he is reported to have established a contact lens division. Buckshey, who is known to have served five former Presidents of India and the Dalai Lama, is a former president of the Indian Contact Lens Society and the Indian Optometric Association and is credited with performing over 15,000 surgeries. He was honored by the Government of India, in 2000, with the fourth highest Indian civilian award Padma Shri.

See also

 Optometry

References

Indian optometrists
Recipients of the Padma Shri in medicine
People from Gwalior
Medical doctors from Madhya Pradesh
Living people
1955 births
20th-century Indian medical doctors